The Anna C. Diller Opera House is a historic three-story building in Diller, Nebraska. It was built as a two-part commercial block in 1912 thanks to a donation by Anne C. Diller, whose late husband William H. Oilier had co-founded Diller. Inside, there is a  42 feet wide by 67 feet long auditorium with a 20 feet wide by 14 feet high proscenium arch. The building has been listed on the National Register of Historic Places since July 6, 1988.

References

National Register of Historic Places in Jefferson County, Nebraska
Theatres completed in 1912
Theatres on the National Register of Historic Places in Nebraska
1912 establishments in Nebraska